Andaleeb Wajid is a Bangalore-based writer.

Personal life
She began writing at age 10, and studied at Baldwin Girls High School before joining Jyoti Nivas College. She is married and has two sons.

Bibliography

Novels 
Kite Strings (2009)
Blinkers Off (2011) 
My Brothers Wedding (2013)
More than just biryani (2014) 
The Tamanna Trilogy (2014)
When she went away (2016) 
Asmara's summer (2016) 
 Twenty-Nine Going on Thirty
 House of Screams (2018)

References

External links
 
 Andaleeb Wajid at Rupa Publications
 Andaleeb Wajid at Penguin India

Living people
Indian Muslims
Writers from Bangalore
Year of birth missing (living people)